What Happened to Father? is a lost 1915 silent film comedy directed by C. Jay Williams and starring stage comedian Frank Daniels. Cecilie B. Peterson penned the script from a 1909 story by Mary Roberts Rinehart.

Cast
Bernice Berner - Mother
Frank Daniels - Father
John Hollis - Butler
Adele Kelly - Fredericka
Frank Kingsley - Mortimer
Anna Laughlin - Tommy
Billy Quirk - Dawson Hale
William Sellery - Uncle
William Sloan - Carlton Bayne (*as William Sloane)

See also
What Happened to Father? (1927)

References

External links
 What Happened to Father? at IMDb.com

1915 films
American silent feature films
Lost American films
American black-and-white films
Silent American comedy films
1915 comedy films
Vitagraph Studios films
Films based on works by Mary Roberts Rinehart
1915 lost films
Lost comedy films
1910s American films